This is a list of holders of the title of Sheriff of Meirionnydd between 1600 and 1699.

A Sheriff is the legal representative of the monarch, and is appointed annually for each county in Wales and England. Their duty is to keep the peace in the county, and to ensure the country follows the law of the monarch. Originally, the job was a position of status and strength, but today it is principally a ceremonial role.

1600s 
 1600: Piers Salesbury
 1601: Sir John Wynn, Castle Gwydir 
 1602: Robert Lloyd Rhiwgoch
 1603: Griffith Vaughan Corsygedol
 1604: Thomas Vaughan Pantglas, Caernarfonshire
 1605: Thomas Needham
 1606: Sir William Maurice Clenennau
 1607: Sir James Pryse Ynysmaengwyn
 1608: Ednyfed Griffith Gwydgwian
 1609: John Price, Rhiwlas

1610s 
 1610: Matthew Herbert Dolguog, Machynlleth, Montgomeryshire
 1611: William Lewis Anwyl, Parc, Llanfrothen (1 season)
 1612: Sir John Wynn, 2nd Farwnig, Castle Gwydir 
 1613: John Lloyd Faenol
 1614: John Vaughan Caergai
 1615: Robert Lloyd Rhiwgoch
 1616: John Lloyd Rhiwaedog
 1617: Lewis Complaint Dolaugwyn
 1618: John Lewis, Ffestiniog
 1618 William Wynn, Glyn
 1619: Humfrey Hughes, Gwerclas

1620s 
 1620: Sir James Pryse Ynysmaengwyn
 1621: John Vaughan Caergai
 1622: John Vaughan Caethle
 1623: Thomas Lloyd, Nantfreyer
 1624: William Lewis Anwyl, Park, Llanfrothen (2 seasons)
 1625: Robert Lloyd Rhiwgoch
 1626: William Vaughan Cors y Gedol
 1626 Rowland Pugh
 1627: Hugh Nanney, Nannau (1 season)
 1628: Prys Lloyd, Dol
 1629: William Oxwicke, Coventry

1630s 
 1630: Henry Price Taltreuddyn
 1631: Robert Wynn
 1632: John Owen Clenennau
 1633: Edmund Meyricke Garthlwyd
 1634: Lewis Nanney Maes-y-pandy
 1635: Evan Evans, Tan y bwlch
 1636: Richard Vaughan (Cors y Gedol), who died and was followed by John Lloyd Rhiwaedog
 1637: William Wynn,  Glyn (2 seasons)
 1638: Hugh Nanney, Nannau (2 seasons)
 1639: Griffith Lloyd, Maesyneuadd

1640s 
 1640: Thomas Phillips Swydd Amwythig
 1641: Lewis Anwyl and Griffith Nanney, Dolaugwyn (jointly)
 1642: John Lloyd Rhiwaedog
 1643 Griffith Nanney
 1643: Rowland Vaughan Caergai
 1644: John Morgan Celli-Iorwerth
 1645: William Owen, Brogyntyn, Cwnstabl Castle Harlech
 1646: Vacant
 1647: Lewis Owen, Peniarth
 1648: Owen Salisbury Rhug
 1649: Maurice Williams, Hafodgarregog

1650s 
 1650: Robert Anwyl, Llanfrothen
 1651: Maurice Wynne Crogen
 1652: John Lloyd Maesypandy
 1653: Lewis Lloyd Rhiwaedog
 1654: Morris Lewis
 1655: William Vaughan, Caethle 
 1656: John Anwyl Llanfendigaid
 1656: Robert Wynn, Basis (1 season)
 1657: Howel Vaughan, Glanllyn
 1659-1660: Richard Anwyl (2 years)
 1661: Humfrey Hughes Gwerclas
 1662: William Salesbury Rhug
 1663:. Roger Mostyn,  Dolycorslwyn
 1664: John Wynne Cwm-
 1665: Maurice Williams Hafodgaregog
 1665: Lewis Lloyd, Rhiwaedog
 1667: John Lloyd Maes-y-pandy
 1668: Richard Wynn, Branas
 1668: Robert Wynn Glyn and Ystumcegid (2 seasons)
 1669: Charles Kiffin Crecoch

1670s 
 1670: John Vaughan
 1671: Maurice Wynn Moelyglo
 1672: Howel Vaughan, Flag
 1673: Nathaniel Jones Hendwr
 1674: Owen Wynne Glyn
 1675: Hugh Tudyr Egryn
 1676: Sir John Wynn, 5th Baron Gwydir and Rhiwgoch and Wynnstay, Denbighshire.
 1677: Griffith Vaughan Cors y Gedol
 1678: John Nanney Llanfendigaid
 1679: Robert Wynn Maes-y-Neuadd (the son of Maurice, 1671)
 1680: Richard Nanney Cefn-Deuddwr

1680s 
 1681: Edmund Meyrick Ucheldre
 1682: William Vaughan Caergai
 1683: Vincent Corbet, Ynysmaengwyn
 1683 Robert Pew
 1684: Anthony Thomas Hendwr
 1685 Maurice Jones, Hendwr
 1685: Lewis Lewis Penmaen
 1686: Richard Poole Caenest
 1687: Richard Mytton Dinas Mawddwy
 1688 John Jones, Uwchlaw'r Coed
 1688: Sir Robert Owen, Glyn
 1689: Charles Hughes Gwerclas

1690s 
 1690: John Jones Uwchlaw'rcoed
 1691:John Grosvenor (died in post)
 1691: Hugh Nanney Nannau
 1692: Oliver Thomas, Bala
 1692: Thomas Owen Llynlloedd
 1693: Owen Wynne Pengwern
 1694: William Anwyl Dolfriog
 1695: Richard Owen Peniarth
 1696: John Lloyd Aberllefenni
 1697: Howel Vaughan Flag 
 1698: Richard Vaughan Corsydegol
 1699: William Lewis Anwyl Park

References 

17th century in Wales
Merionethshire
High Sheriffs of Merionethshire